Walter Kinsella may refer to:
 Walter Kinsella (tennis), American squash tennis and court tennis player
 Walter Kinsella (actor), American actor